The Shoshone Range is a mountain range in Lander County, Nevada. The northeast end of the range extends into Eureka County at Shoshone Point on the Humboldt River.

The range was named from the Shoshoni language meaning "grass".

References 

Mountain ranges of Nevada
Mountain ranges of Eureka County, Nevada
Mountain ranges of Lander County, Nevada
Range, Shoshone